The orange oriole (Icterus auratus) is a species of bird in the family Icteridae. It is found in the Yucatán Peninsula and far northern Belize.
The male has a bright orange hood and a black bib.
Its natural habitats are subtropical or tropical dry forests and heavily degraded former forest.

References

orange oriole
Birds of the Yucatán Peninsula
orange oriole
orange oriole
Taxonomy articles created by Polbot